Actress, is a 1943 Soviet comedy film directed by Leonid Trauberg.

Plot 
The film tells about the famous actress of the operetta, who decides to leave the profession in the midst of the war, as she thinks that nobody needs anyone else, but she returns to the scene, realizing that the military at the front, in the rear and in hospitals want to hear music.

Starring 
 Galina Sergeyeva as Zoya Vladimirovna Strelnikova
 Boris Babochkin as Pyotr Nikolaevich Markov (as B. Babochkin)
 Zinaida Morskaya as Agafya Lukinichna (as M. Morskaya)
 Vladimir Gribkov as Anatoliy Sergeevich Obolenskiy (as V. Gribkov)
 Mikhail Zharov as Reciter in hospital (as M. Zharov)
 Yuriy Korshun as Vasya Ivanov, Wounded soldier in hospital (as Yu. Korshun)
 Konstantin Sorokin as Zaytsev (as K. Sorokin)
 Nikolay Temyakov as Zinoviy Aleksandrovich, Theater manager (as N. Temyakov)
 Vladimir Shishkin as Shurik (as V. Shishkin)

References

External links 
 

1943 films
1940s Russian-language films
Soviet comedy films
1943 comedy films
Soviet black-and-white films